Béni Nkololo (born 6 November 1996) is a French professional footballer who plays as a winger for A-League club Central Coast Mariners.

Nkololo was born in France and played for Stade Brestois 29 in Ligue 2 and a number of clubs in the Championnat National before moving to Australia to play for Central Coast Mariners in 2021.

Club career
In July 2020, Nkololo signed with Championnat National side US Concarneau.

In August 2021, Nkololo signed with Australian side Central Coast Mariners. He scored on debut for the Mariners in a win over Blacktown City in the 2021 FFA Cup on 13 November 2021.

References

External links
 
 

1996 births
Living people
French footballers
Association football midfielders
Association football forwards
Stade Brestois 29 players
US Avranches players
Tours FC players
Lyon La Duchère players
US Concarneau players
Central Coast Mariners FC players
Ligue 2 players
Championnat National players
Championnat National 3 players
A-League Men players
French expatriate footballers
Expatriate soccer players in Australia
Black French sportspeople
French sportspeople of Democratic Republic of the Congo descent